Joseph Destimo (born 22 September 1943) is a Ghanaian boxer. He competed at the 1968 Summer Olympics and the 1972 Summer Olympics. At the 1968 Summer Olympics, he defeated Walter Henry of Canada, before losing to Servílio de Oliveira of Brazil.

References

1943 births
Living people
Ghanaian male boxers
Olympic boxers of Ghana
Boxers at the 1968 Summer Olympics
Boxers at the 1972 Summer Olympics
People from Volta Region
Flyweight boxers